Strzałkowo can refer to three villages in Poland:
Strzałkowo, Masovian Voivodeship (east-central Poland)
Strzałkowo, Greater Poland Voivodeship (west-central Poland)
Strzałkowo, Warmian-Masurian Voivodeship (north Poland)